Wawa Chaki (Quechua wawa child, baby, chaki foot, "child foot", Hispanicized spelling Huahuachaqui, also Negra Huahuachaqui, Negro Huahuachaqui) is a mountain in the Andes of southern Peru, about  high. It is situated in the Moquegua Region, Mariscal Nieto Province, Carumas District. Wawa Chaki lies southwest of the mountains Uma Jalsu and Millu.

References

Mountains of Moquegua Region
Mountains of Peru